Majalengka is a town and district in West Java, Indonesia. The district is the regency seat of Majalengka Regency. At the 2010 Census, the district had a population of 68,871, of which the town (comprising the communities of Majalengka Wetan and Majalengka Kulon) had a population of 20,906. At the 2020 Census, the town population had decreased to 20,549, while the district had 73,420 inhabitants in mid 2021. 

In Rajaguluh, one of the villages in Majalengka,  from the town of Majalengka, there is a traditional food called "pedesan bebek" which tastes very good and a little bit spicy.

Administrative divisions
Majalengka consists of 14 villages (Kelurahan or Desa) which are as follows:

 Babakan Jawa
 Cibodas
 Cicurug
 Cijati
 Cikasarung
 Kawunggirang
 Kulur
 Majalengka Kulon
 Majalengka Wetan
 Munjul
 Sidamukti
 Sindangkasi
 Tarikolot
 Tonjong

Toll Road Access

Education
Here is the list of colleges in Majalengka:

Public institutions:
 Universitas Majalengka
Private institutions:
 SEAPIN / STT STAPIN Majalengka

Climate
Majalengka has a tropical monsoon climate (Am) with moderate rainfall from June to October and heavy to very heavy rainfall from November to May.

References

External links

 Kabupaten Majalengka
 Majalengka Business Center
 Blogger Majalengka
 LSM RESMI
 SEAPIN / STT STAPIN Majalengka

Majalengka Regency
Populated places in West Java
Regency seats of West Java